Dragon Hunters (French: Chasseurs de dragons) is an animated fantasy comedy television series created by Arthur Qwak and produced by the French company Futurikon and Tooncan.  It follows the adventures of two hunters for hire through a medieval world of floating land masses that is terrorized by a widely varying menace of monsters known collectively as dragons.  A 3-D feature film and a videogame based on the same creative universe have also been released.

Plot
Set in a Medieval world made of Floating Land Masses, two men, Gwizdo and Lian-Chu, are professional dragon hunters who have known each other since they were children. Perpetually flat broke, they are forced to continually stay at the Snoring Dragon Inn until they can get another dragon-hunting contract to pay their rent. The proprietress of the inn is Jeanneline, a three-time divorcee with two daughters, one of whom is also a professional dragon hunter who doesn't see her mother much.

Cast and characters

Main characters
Lian-Chu is a sword-wielding, muscle-bound warrior who actually deals out the dragon slaying. In contrast to Gwizdo, he is more kindhearted and honorable.  He is also an avid knitter. In the episode "The Conjunction of the Three Moons", it is revealed that his parents were killed by a dragon, and in "Farewell Lian-Chu" it's revealed that they were killed because his uncle did not give notice to the people when the dragon was on his way to the village. He only knows how to count to 10 and can not read and thus depends on Gwizdo for this.

French voice: Alexis Victor (season 1), Thierry Desroses (season 2), Vincent Lindon (movie)
English voice: Harry Standjofski (season 1), Forest Whitaker (movie)

Gwizdo is the brains of the group, and negotiates their contracts with the helpless people terrorized by dragons. He is a small, gangly young man who speaks with a New York or New Jersey accent. He and Lian-Chu have known each other since childhood, and were raised together in an orphanage called Mother Hubbard's Farm.  He is avaricious, cowardly, egotistical, cynical and unsympathetic, and abuses Hector  constantly with violence and insults. However, he has a heart of gold hidden deep inside, which is elicited by Lian-Chu, Zaza or anyone else he considers a close friend. Furthermore, he is charismatic, and therefore something of a lovable rogue. In "The Orphan Farm" it's revealed that his egotism stems from his miserable childhood at Mother Hubbard's Orphan Farm, where he was bullied, abused and called names for being scared all the time. He is the one who can read, write and count at the inn, therefore Lian-Chu and Jeanneline depend on him for business and contracts. He also flies their airship, the St. George, and wears a pilot's cap (which he very rarely takes off) and goggles. A good deal of the time his attempts to exploit others' predicaments leads to failure, either because of some oversight or because his better nature prevails.

French voice: Ludovic Pinette (series), Patrick Timsit (movie)
English voice: Rick Jones (season 1), Rob Paulsen (movie)

Hector is their pet dog-like-dragon who does not possess the evil nature or the great size of the ones they hunt and acts like a dog. With his fur and ears he seems to be based on a variation of the Asian dragon (similar to Falkor the Luck Dragon in The Neverending Story). His hobbies are eating and picking on other animals such as chickens or sheep. While Gwizdo is the pilot of the St. George, Hector is required to pedal for the propeller, a task he is not fond of.  He speaks with a mixture of grunts and pidgin English.

French voice: Frédéric Sanchez (series), Jeremy Prevost (movie)
English voice: Rick Jones (season 1), Dave Wittenberg (movie)

Other characters
Jennyline runs the Snoring Dragon Inn, where Lian-Chu and Gwizdo live. Lian-Chu and Gwizdo owe her an ever-growing debt for room and board. She is a heavyset woman who is short-tempered, strict, irascible and cynical.  She has had three past marriages, which have resulted in Zoria, Zaza and possibly other children. She's in love with Gwizdo and wants to marry him, but he's too scared to commit to a relationship. Her name is given as Jennyline on the DVDs and Janelynn on the official website. The French and German variations of her name are Jeanneline.

French voice: Murielle Naigeon
English voice: Sonja Ball (season 1)

Zoe is Jennyline's oldest daughter, and is an accomplished dragon hunter in her own right.  Like Zaza, she was inspired by Lian-Chu and Gwizdo at a young age, and trained with them to learn the moves and arts of the business.  She is not a resident of the inn and makes few appearances, but is well known by the main characters.  A victim of sexism, she has donned a male disguise in some parts to get more bounties, and goes by the name Zoria.

French voice: Marie Drion (movie)
English voice: Mary Mouser (movie)

Zaza is Jennyline's youngest daughter.  She resides at the Snoring Dragon Inn as an assistant.  She idolizes Lian-Chu and has dreams of becoming a dragon hunter when she grows up, of which Jennyline disapproves.  She spends most of her time at the inn, but occasionally joins the hunters on quests, often through her own means.

French voice: Audrey Pic (season 1), Catherine Desplaces (season 2)
English voice: Annie Bovaird (season 1)

Noble Kayo is an elderly doctor whom the hunters sometimes turn to for advice regarding strange conditions, such as poison and paralysis.  While intelligent, he is almost completely blind and a bit absent-minded, which makes having a straightforward conversation with him very difficult. In the French version his name is "Kao", which is pronounced the same as the French word for "chaos".

George and Gilbert Forrestal are a two-brother hunter duo, who know Lian-Chu and Gwizdo from growing up alongside them in the orphanage.  They look down on Gwizdo and refer to him as a pipsqueak, and often bring up embarrassing childhood events of his.  They see no room for competition, and often try to get the hunters' bounties themselves.

Prince Granion de Bismuth is the youngest son of Queen Clothilda. He is a selfless, noble, and somewhat naive hunter who hunts the dragons for free. His two older brothers were killed in dragon battles.

Episodes

Season 1

Season 2

Broadcast
The program was featured in the United States on Cartoon Network for a few weeks around January 2006, but, after having its time slot moved, vanished from the line-up. It returned in September 2006, only to disappear again in October 2006. Up until June 2007, it was available for viewing on Cartoon Network Video. In 2011, it was airing in the U.S. on Starz Kids & Family. 50 of the 52 episodes were available in English on Netflix through their partnership with Starz though the episodes were released out of order.

A second season of 26 episodes began airing in France in August 2007. International releases of both seasons have occurred in over 70 countries. A fanbase was formed in Arabic speaking countries, due to being broadcast on MBC 3. In October 2017, the series premiered in Bangladesh on Duronto TV, dubbed in Bengali.

Home media
Geneon has released five DVDs (containing episodes 1 - 17) in the U.S. and Canada.

Dragon Hunters Vol. 1: "It's A Dragon's Life"
Dragon Hunters Vol. 2: "Dead Dragon Walking"
Dragon Hunters Vol. 3: "There's No Place Like Home!"
Dragon Hunters Vol. 4: "Don't Look Now"
Dragon Hunters Vol. 5: "Unwelcome Guests"

Other media

Collectors game
The Die Drachenjäger (Dragon Hunters) collectors' game was created and distributed by Dracco Company Ltd, which was a new addition to the Dracco Company's merchandise. The game, released in Belgium, featured forty collectible figurines that resembled the monsters, dragons, and the heads of the main characters, Lian Chu, Gwizdo, Zaza, Hector, and Jennyline. The game plays identically to Dracco Heads.

A collection of figurines has also been featured by Revell.

Junior Novelizations
A series of junior novelizations of the episodes were published in France.

Comics
The comic series Chasseurs de Dragons was published by Delcourt in France and co-edited in the US by Peace Arch.

Movie

Directed by Guillaume Ivernel (also art director) and Arthur Qwak, producer by Philippe Delarue, a full-length computer-animated 3D movie was made by Mac Guff Ligne Paris, Futurikon and Trixter Film GmbH. The film is a prequel to the series, with Lian Chu, Gwizdo and Hector as roving travelers, and a young Zoria, then known as Princess Zoe.

A four-minute teaser was shown in both the Annecy Animation Festival and the Marché du Film in 2007.

It premiered on March 19, 2008 in Russia, and on March 26 in Belgium and France, and premiered 2010 in Mexico. It premiered on April 5, 2008 in the United States as part of the Sarasota Film Festival. Rob Paulsen confirmed at a convention interview that he and Forest Whitaker were respectively voicing Gwizdo and Lian Chu.

Covers
The show's theme, "The Dragon Hunters Song", is performed by the English rock band The Cure. The Cure took their song : 'Taking off' and changed it up for the show's theme. This track was available as a single and a track on the German compilation CD Toggo Music 11 in 2005, both now out of print.

References to popular culture
The air vehicle that Lian-chu, Gwizdo and Hector ride on is named after St. George.
The floating landscapes featured in the series are inspired by the fantasy artwork of Roger Dean, traditional Chinese Shan shui paintings as well as the landscapes of German painter Caspar David Friedrich.

References

External links
 
 
 
 

2000s Canadian animated television series
2000s French animated television series
2006 Canadian television series debuts
2006 French television series debuts
2010s Canadian animated television series
2010s French animated television series
2012 Canadian television series endings
2012 French television series endings
Canadian children's animated comedy television series
French children's animated comedy television series
Canadian children's animated fantasy television series
French children's animated fantasy television series
France Télévisions children's television series
France Télévisions television comedy
Hunting in popular culture